Jitka Antošová (born 13 March 1987) is a Czech rower. She competed at the 2008 Summer Olympics in Beijing with the women's double sculls where they came sixth. At the 2012 Summer Olympics in London, she competed in the women's double sculls with her sister Lenka as rowing partner.

References

1987 births
Living people
Czech female rowers
Olympic rowers of the Czech Republic
Rowers at the 2008 Summer Olympics
Rowers at the 2012 Summer Olympics
People from Děčín
European Rowing Championships medalists
Sportspeople from the Ústí nad Labem Region